Lorgia García Peña is an ethnic studies scholar, and professor at Tufts University. She serves as Mellon Professor of Studies in Race, Colonialism, and Diaspora. She will join the Department of African American Studies and the   Effron Center for the Study of America at Princeton University on July 1, 2023. She became a subject of national attention after being denied tenure at Harvard University.

Early life and education
García Peña grew up in the Dominican Republic until she was 12 years old, when she immigrated to the United States, joining her parents who had departed earlier for Trenton, New Jersey. She finished high school at 15 and, as her parents felt she was too young to go away to college, enrolled at Rutgers University. She subsequently earned a master's degree in Spanish and Latin American literatures and cultures from Rutgers and a master's and Ph.D. in American cultures from the University of Michigan.

Career
García Peña began teaching at the University of Georgia in 2010. She taught at Harvard University from 2013 to 2021, jointly appointed in the Romance Languages and Literature department and the History and Literature program. She served as assistant professor, then Roy G. Clause Associate Professor. She was denied tenure in November 2019, and though different groups repeatedly urged the university to revisit the decision, the university did not. The case is pending before the Massachusetts Commission Against Discrimination, as García Peña alleges it was part of a pattern of discrimination she encountered across her time at Harvard.

She was appointed to a tenured position at Tufts University in the Department of Studies in Race, Colonialism, and Diaspora and began teaching in fall 2021. The position is supported by a $1.5 million grant from the Andrew W. Mellon Foundation.

García Peña was selected by the Marguerite Casey Foundation as a 2021 Freedom Scholars, honoring "emerging leaders in academia whose research can provide critical insight to social justice leaders and whose ideas encourage all of us to imagine how we can radically improve our democracy, economy and society." The award grants recipients $250,000 in recognition of their work in "cultivating and nurturing movements for justice and freedom."

She will join the Department of African American Studies at Princeton University on July 1, 2023.

Works
García Peña is author of The Borders of Dominicanidad: Race, Nation and Archives of Contradiction, published by Duke University Press in 2016. The book won  2017 National Women's Studies Association Gloria E. Anzaldúa Book Prize, the 2016 LASA Latino/a Studies Book Award, and the 2016 Isis Duarte Book Prize in Haiti and Dominican Studies. Reviewing The Borders of Dominicanidad for The Latin Americanist, Sobeira Latorre said the book “offers a historically grounded, meticulously researched, and thoughtful analysis of how dominant narratives of Dominican racial and national identity developed, and the ways in which these narratives have historically excluded racialized people.” The Spanish translation received national attention in the Dominican Republic and the Spanish speaking diaspora.

García Peña has also published Community as Rebellion: A Syllabus for Surviving Academia as a Woman of Color (Haymarket Books 2022) and Translating Blackness: Latinx Colonialities in Global Perspective (Duke University Press, 2022).

García Peña has also written on social and political issues in The New York Times, Harpers Bazaar, The Boston Review, NACLA, Asterix, Aperture Magazine, among other outlets.

References

External links
 Interview in Esendom
 Interview in the Boston Review

Dominican Republic emigrants to the United States
People from Trenton, New Jersey
Rutgers University alumni
University of Michigan alumni
Tufts University faculty
Harvard University faculty
Year of birth missing (living people)
Living people
21st-century Dominican Republic historians
Dominican Republic women historians